The 1944 Klamath Falls Marine Barracks football team was an American football team that represented the United States Marines Corps' Marine Barracks at Klamath Falls, Oregon, during the 1944 college football season. The team compiled a 2–2–1 record and played its home games at Modoc Field. 

The Klamath Falls Barracks were built in 1944 as a treatment and rehabilitation center for Marines returning from the Pacific Theater of Operations, especially those suffering from mosquito-borne diseases. Players were recruited from the 2,000-plus Marines undergoing treatment at the center.

Maj. Clyde C. Roberts was the head coach and ran the team in a single wingback formation. Roberts was the executive officer at the barracks and had been head coach at the Brown Military Academy in San Diego.

Schedule

References

Klamath Falls Marines
Klamath Falls Marines